Doxocopa laure, the silver emperor, is a species of butterfly of the family Nymphalidae.

Description 
The upperside of the wing is dark brown with a slight bluey iridescence, with a white central band on the hindwing, and an orange forewing on males. For females, the upperside is dark brown with no iridescence, with a white median band on both wings, ending with a yellow spot at the hindwing leading edge. On both sexes, the underside of the hindwing is greyish with a silver iridescence.

Distribution 
This species occurs year-round in Brazil and Mexico, and during July–December in southern North America areas, such as Texas.

Subspecies 
 Doxocopa laure laure (Mexico, Honduras, Guatemala)
 Doxocopa laure laura (Hübner, [1823]) (Jamaica)
 Doxocopa laure druryi (Hübner, [1825]) (Cuba)
 Doxocopa laure griseldis (C. & R. Felder, 1862) (Upper Amazon, Peru)
 Doxocopa laure laurona (Schaus, 1902) (Brazil: Rio de Janeiro)
 Doxocopa laure mima (Fruhstorfer, 1907) (Colombia, Trinidad)

References 
 

Apaturinae
Butterflies of North America
Butterflies of Central America
Butterflies of the Caribbean
Nymphalidae of South America
Butterflies of Cuba
Butterflies of Jamaica
Lepidoptera of Brazil
Lepidoptera of Venezuela
Butterflies described in 1773
Taxa named by Dru Drury